USS Leader may refer to the following ships of the United States Navy:

 , a patrol craft commissioned 24 October 1942
 , a fleet minesweeper commissioned 16 November 1955

United States Navy ship names